The Autopista A2, also known as Primer Anillo de La Habana (First Ring of Havana), is a Cuban motorway serving the city of Havana, that connects almost all of the Cuban motorways to each other.

Route
The A2 is a dual carriageway with 6 lanes and has a beltway (Autopista Aeropuerto) to the International Airport of Havana. It connects A1 and A4, the longest autopistas of Cuba, both classified as Autopista Nacional. The northeastern section of A2, from the intersection with the Vía Blanca to the Tunnel, is part of the state highway "Circuito Norte" (CN).

See also

Roads in Cuba
Transportation in Cuba
Infrastructure of Cuba

References

External links

A2
Transport in Havana